Roland Garros may refer to:

Roland Garros (aviator) (1888–1918), French aviator and World War I fighter pilot
Roland-Garros, commonly called the French Open, one of four major tennis tournaments
Stade Roland Garros, a tennis stadium complex in Paris
Roland Garros Airport, an airport in Saint-Denis, Réunion

See also

 
 Roland (disambiguation)
 Garros (disambiguation)